The 1967-68 Central Professional Hockey League season was the fifth season of the Central Professional Hockey League, a North American minor pro league. Eight teams participated in the regular season, and the Tulsa Oilers won the league title.

Regular season

Playoffs

First round 
 (N1) Tulsa Oilers - (S1) Oklahoma City Blazers 4:3
 (N2) Kansas City Blues - (N3) Memphis South Stars 3:0
 (S2) Fort Worth Wings - (S3) Dallas Black Hawks 3:2

Second round 
 (N1) Tulsa Oilers - bye
 (S2) Fort Worth Wings - (N2) Kansas City Blues 3:1

Final 
 (N1) Tulsa Oilers - (S2) Fort Worth Wings 4:0

External links
 Statistics on hockeydb.com

CPHL
Central Professional Hockey League seasons